The 2017 LA Galaxy season was the club's twenty-second season of existence, and their twenty-second season in Major League Soccer, the top flight of American soccer.

2017 marked a downturn for the club signalling the end of a dynasty for the Galaxy. It was the first season since 2008 that the Galaxy failed to qualify for the MLS Cup Playoffs.

Players

Squad information

Transfers

Transfers in

Player rights

Draft picks 

The LA Galaxy passed on making a selection with the 81st overall pick.

Transfers out

Competitions

Preseason 
The first preseason match was announced on December 9, 2016. The full preseason schedule was released on January 20, 2017.

Mid-season Friendlies

Major League Soccer

Standings

Overall

Western Conference

Regular season 
All times in Pacific Time Zone.

U.S. Open Cup

Fourth round 
The pairing for the fourth round was announced on May 18, 2017.

Round of 16 
The draw for this round was held on June 15, 2017.

Quarterfinal

Player statistics

Top scorers

As of October 22.

See also 
 2017 in American soccer
 2017 LA Galaxy II season

References

External links 
 

LA Galaxy seasons
La Galaxy
La Galaxy
LA Galaxy
2017 in Los Angeles